Amauroascus is a genus of fungi in the family Onygenaceae. The genus was described by German mycologist Joseph Schröter in 1893, with Amauroascus verrucosus as the type species.

Species
Amauroascus albicans
Amauroascus aureus
Amauroascus burundensis
Amauroascus cubensis
Amauroascus desertorum
Amauroascus javanicus
Amauroascus kuehnii
Amauroascus malaysianus
Amauroascus mutatus
Amauroascus niger
Amauroascus oblatus
Amauroascus purpureus
Amauroascus tropicalis
Amauroascus verrucosus
Amauroascus volatilis-patellis

References

External links

Eurotiomycetes genera
Eurotiomycetes
Taxa described in 1893
Taxa named by Joseph Schröter